Suguo is a traditional dish in Zibo, Shandong province for the Spring Festival (Chinese New Year). The inventor Su Xiaomei  is the younger sister of Su Shi-a famous poet in Song Dynasty.

Cooking Method and Nutritional Value 
The dish can be cooked using pork, Saccharina japonica, lotus root, tofu and so on.

References 

Chinese New Year foods